Hannah L. Landecker (born 1969) is an American author and academic working as a professor of sociology at the University of California, Los Angeles and director of the UCLA Institute for Society and Genetics.

Education 
Landecker earned a Bachelor of Science degree from the University of British Columbia and a PhD from the Massachusetts Institute of Technology.

Career 
Landecker's research interests are the social and historical study of biotechnology and life science and the intersections of biology and technology, with a particular focus on cells and the in vitro conditions of life in research settings. Landecker was assistant professor of anthropology at Rice University through 2007. She was a visiting scholar at University of Texas Medical Branch in 2004, where she worked on a project that examined the changing human relationship to living matter in an age of biotechnology. She is also worked on developing new methods and curricula for teaching the history and social study of biotechnology to undergraduates. Recent work includes looking at ways in which antibiotic resistance has become a key marker of the Anthropocene.

Publications
 Culturing Life: How Cells Became Technologies; Harvard University Press (2007) 
 Cellular Features: Microcinematography and Early Film Theory, Critical Inquiry 31(4):903-937. (2005)
 Living Differently in Time: Plasticity, Temporality, and Cellular Biotechnologies, Culture Machine 7 (2005) 
 Immortality, In Vitro: A History of the HeLa Cell Line. Biotechnology and Culture: Bodies, Anxieties, Ethics, ed. Paul Brodwin; Indiana University Press: 53-74. (2000)

References

External links
Hannah Landecker at UCLA

Living people
University of British Columbia alumni
Massachusetts Institute of Technology alumni
Rice University faculty
University of California, Los Angeles faculty
American sociologists
American women sociologists
American women social scientists
Sociologists of science
Medical sociologists
Historians of science
21st-century American women
1969 births